The Fault in Our Stars is a 2012 novel by John Green.

The Fault in Our Stars may also refer to:

 The Fault in Our Stars (film), a 2014 adaptation of the novel
 The Fault in Our Stars (soundtrack), the 2014 soundtrack album to the film
 Naked City (TV series), episode 59 "The Fault in Our Stars," 1961.

See also
 The Fault Is Not Yours, a 2019 South Korean film
 Dil Bechara, a 2020 Hindi adaptation of the novel